Bogdan is a village in the municipality of Dobrichka, in Dobrich Province, in northeastern Bulgaria.

References

Villages in Dobrich Province